Torkan is an Iranian surname. Notable people with the surname include:

Akbar Torkan, Iranian mechanical engineer and politician
Majid Torkan (born 1964), Iranian freestyle wrestler

See also
Türkan (disambiguation)

Persian-language surnames